Nikolaus von der Nonne (1836-1906) - Russian engineer of ethnic German origin, urban engineer of Baku. Best known for being the mayor of the city of Baku in 1898-1901.

Early life 
He was born on 16 June 1836 to ethnic German family in Saint Peterburg Governorate. His father Johann Georg August Ernst von der Nonne (1798-1860) was a German nobleman originally from the city of Bodenwerder, Lower Saxony. His mother Anna (1810-1891) belonged to baronial family of von Tornau. He adhered to Lutheranism.

Career 
Nikolaus was educated in the First Cadet Corps in St. Petersburg, after which on June 11, 1855 he was promoted to officer and assigned to the 6th Sapper Battalion, which at that time participated in Crimean War and the siege of Sevastopol. In 1856 he was transferred to the military service in the Caucasus, participating in the Caucasian War. He received Order of St. George (4th class) on 8 September 1859 as poruchik for battles for the village of Shauri. From 1864 to 1881 he served under different departments under Viceroyalty of Caucasus. He was promoted to the rank of colonel in 1880.

In 1881, he was appointed as the provincial engineer of the Construction Department of the Provincial Board of the Baku Governorate, continuing to be listed among the engineering troops. In August 1883, von der Nonne transferred to the service in the city duma, where he was appointed chief urban engineer at the Baku city government. On January 18, 1884 he was elected chairman of the Baku branch of the Russian Technical Society (IRTS). He was dismissed from service for domestic reasons with a uniform and a pension by the Imperial Order on November 18, 1884. He personally met Alexander III during his visit to Baku on October 8-10, 1888.

After this, he worked as architect as well and built Palace of De Boure in 1891. He submitted a petition to the city government to dismiss him from service due to illness on September 15, 1894 but only in October 1894 he left the city service.

In 1898 he drew up the plan of Baku, which laid foundations of Baku as the modern city it is. By the time of the development of the general plan of Baku in 1898, the quarters located to the north of the Baku fortress were implemented in the form of a clear rectangular grid. According to von der Nonne's plan, the projected area doubled the city's planned area. 

He became mayor of the Baku with majority voting of city duma and approved by Prince Grigory Golitsyn in October 1898, started his official term on November 4, 1898. The mayor of Baku was at the same time the head of the city council and the director of the Baku branch of the Baku provincial prison guardian committee. In 1901, von der Nonne was also elected an honorary justice of the peace in Baku. Only 3 years later in 1901, he retired from his position, citing illness. After his resignation, he moved to Tbilisi, where his daughter lived. 

He died on 13 August 1908, aged 72 in Tbilisi and buried in Stavropol, next to his parents.

Family 
He was married to ethnic Tbilisi Armenian Maria Pavlovna von der Nonne (née Bashinjaghov) and had two issues:

 Nikolai von der Nonne (4 March 1862 - 1919) – colonel of the Imperial Russian Army, married Olga Belkina (1864-1935)
 Konstantin von der Nonne (d. 1900) – worked in the Office of the Transcaucasian Railway
 Zoa von der Nonne 
 Maria von der Nonne – married Vladimir Chikalin (b. 1853), lieutenant-general of the Imperial Russian Army

He also had several brothers and sister, namely Alexander (b. 1831), Theodore (b. 1836), Michael (1839-1919) and Anna (married Eugen Alexander von Ovander in 1864). His brother Michael von der Nonne was Yerevan's urban architect.

References 

Mayors of Baku
1836 births
1908 deaths
Germans from Russia
Lutherans from the Russian Empire
Recipients of the Order of St. George of the Fourth Degree